Allison Hirschlag is the daughter of long-time actress Julia Barr of All My Children. Hirschlag was the third actress to play Lizzie Spaulding on Guiding Light, from 2002 to 2003.

Hirschlag attended Dwight-Englewood School in Englewood, New Jersey.

References

External links 
 

Living people
American television actresses
Place of birth missing (living people)
American soap opera actresses
People from Englewood, New Jersey
Actresses from New Jersey
Dwight-Englewood School alumni
1984 births
21st-century American women